Ranbir Singh Gangwa Prajapati (born 4 March 1964) is an Indian politician. He is a member of Rajya Sabha from Indian National Lok Dal party from 2010 to 2014. He was elected as a member of Haryana Legislative Assembly in 2014 after beating sitting MLA and then minister Sampat Singh and Jasma Devi w/o former chief minister Bhajan Lal & also won in 2019 from Nalwa (Vidhan Sabha constituency) in Hisar. He had joined Bharatiya Janata Party just before 2019 Indian general election.

Biography 
Ranbir Singh Gangwa was born on 4 March 1964 in village Gangwa, Hisar district. His father's name was Shri Rajaram and mother's name is Smt. Kesar Devi. His wife is Smt. Angoori Devi with whom he got married at very early age. Together they have two sons.

References

1964 births
Haryana MLAs 2014–2019
Indian National Lok Dal politicians
People from Hisar district
Living people
Rajya Sabha members from Haryana
Haryana district councillors
Bharatiya Janata Party politicians from Haryana